Sohrababad may refer to:

Sohrababad, Ardabil
Sohrababad, Lorestan
Sohrababad, Sistan and Baluchestan